Richard Michael Cockayne Frith (born 8 April 1949) is a British retired Anglican bishop who served as Bishop of Hull and Bishop of Hereford.

Early life
Frith was born into a clerical family on 8 April 1949; his father was Roger Cokayne Frith, sometime canon and Vicar of Feltwell. He was educated at Marlborough College and Fitzwilliam College, Cambridge. He undertook training for ministry at St John's College, Nottingham.

Ordained ministry
Frith was made a deacon at Michaelmas 1974 (6 October) and ordained a priest the Michaelmas following (28 September 1975), both times by Mervyn Stockwood, Bishop of Southwark, at Southwark Cathedral. He began his ordained ministry as a curate in Mortlake, after which he was Vicar of Thamesmead. Following this he was Rector of Keynsham. Finally, before his ordination to the episcopate, he was the Archdeacon of Taunton from 1992.

Frith is also a trustee of maritime welfare charity the Mission to Seafarers.

Episcopal ministry
In January 1999, Frith became suffragan Bishop of Hull.  On 16 July 2014, it was announced that Frith was to become the next Bishop of Hereford. His canonical election was confirmed on 17 October 2014 and he was installed 22 November 2014 in Hereford Cathedral. His retirement has been announced, effective 30 November 2019.

Views
Frith is a supporter of introducing a blessing service to follow a civil same-sex marriage or civil partnership.

Personal life
Frith was married first to Jill Richardson from 1975 until 2000, having four children, and remarried in 2006. His son, James, was the Labour MP for Bury North.

Styles
The Reverend Richard Frith (1974–1992)
The Venerable Richard Frith (1992–1998)
The Right Reverend Richard Frith (1998–present)

References

1949 births
People educated at Marlborough College
Alumni of Fitzwilliam College, Cambridge
Alumni of St John's College, Nottingham
Archdeacons of Taunton
20th-century Church of England bishops
21st-century Church of England bishops
Bishops of Hull
Living people